The 2022 FIBA Asia Cup qualification was a basketball competition that was played from February 2018 to August 2021, to determine the fifteen FIBA Asia-Oceania nations who would join the automatically qualified host Indonesia at the 2022 FIBA Asia Cup.

Qualification format
In line with the new FIBA Calendar format implemented since 2017, FIBA Asia began their own qualifiers for 2021 FIBA Asia Cup in 2018. Pre-qualifiers were contested on sub-zone and regional basis between Division B teams – teams that did not participate in FIBA Basketball World Cup 2019 Asian Qualifiers. Eight Teams that emerged victorious in the pre-qualifiers qualified to the qualifiers joining sixteen Division A teams – participants at 2017 FIBA Asia Cup and 2019 FIBA Basketball World Cup qualification. Qualifiers started after the 2019 FIBA Basketball World Cup.

Entrants

Pre-Qualifiers

Sub-Zone Pre-Qualifiers
Sub-Zone Pre-Qualifiers took place  during the same second and third windows of 2019 FIBA Basketball World Cup Qualifiers.

All times are local.

Gulf
Teams from the Gulf region played in two different rounds, during the same second and third windows of FIBA Basketball World Cup 2019 Qualifiers. Results from both rounds were aggregated in order to qualify top two teams to the Western Region Pre-Qualifiers.

First round
The first round was held from 23 to 26 February in Bahrain, held during the second window of the 2019 FIBA Basketball World Cup qualification first round.

Second round
The second round was played from 27 to 30 June in United Arab Emirates, during the third window of the 2019 FIBA Basketball World Cup qualification second round.

South Asia
South Asia Basketball Association (SABA) started their pre-qualifiers on 26 June 2018 in Bangladesh, during the third window of the Asian qualifiers. The top two teams advanced to the Western Region Pre-Qualifiers.

Southeast Asia
The Southeast Asia Basketball Association (SEABA) pre-qualifier took place in Nonthaburi, Thailand from 26 to 30 June, during the third window of FIBA Basketball World Cup 2019 Asian qualifiers. The round-robin format tournament featured six teams participating from which the top four advanced to the Eastern Region Pre-Qualifiers.

Regional Pre-Qualifiers
Regional pre-qualifiers featured the twelve teams in total: eight teams advanced from the sub-zone pre-qualifiers and four teams which receive a bye to this stage. They were divided into two regions: Western Region (5 teams) and Eastern Region (7 teams). The top four teams from each region advanced to the Qualifiers.

Eastern Region Pre-Qualifiers
The Pre-Qualifiers (Eastern Region) was held in Nonthaburi, Thailand from 26 November to 1 December 2018, during the fifth window of 2019 World Cup qualification.

The seven teams were divided into two groups. The top three teams of each group qualified to the second round, where they were pitted against the teams in the opposite groups. Head-to-head results from the first round were carried out.

First round

Group A

Group B

Second round

Western Region Pre-Qualifiers
The FIBA Asia Cup 2021 pre-qualifiers (Western Region) were held in Bahrain from 11 to 15 September 2018, during the fourth window of 2019 World Cup qualification. On 14 August 2018, the competition schedules has been confirmed.

Qualifiers

Participating teams

Draw
The draw for the main qualifiers was held on 8 June 2019 in Bangalore, India. Eight pots were used for the seeding of the 24 qualified teams based on geographical and ranking principles. The first four pots were allocated for teams in the East Region, covering teams from the EABA (East Asia), SEABA (Southeast Asia), and FIBA Oceania and the rest for teams in the West Region which has the GBA (Gulf), WABA (Middle East), CABA (Central Asia), and SABA (South Asia) in its scope. The top seeded teams for each region were be allocated in Pot 1 and 5. The top six seeded teams were confirmed on 31 May 2019 based on the FIBA ranking as of 26 February 2019.

All times are local.

First round
Due to the COVID-19 pandemic, the FIBA Executive Committee decided in 2020 September that for the 2020 November and 2021 February windows games in each group were held at a single venue under a bubble format. Games from Group B, C, and F as well as games involving South Korea were not held during the 2020 November window. Top two teams from each group qualified for the 2021 FIBA Asia cup, while all third-placed teams competed in the second round. After the June 2021 window, all games not played were cancelled and groups were ranked based on the games played to date.

Group A
Indonesia was confirmed as hosts of the 2021 FIBA Asia Cup on 18 December 2020, therefore qualifying for the tournament proper regardless of their final placing.

Group B

Group C

Group D

Group E

Group F

Second round
Teams were divided into two groups based on geographical criteria. In total, three teams from this round qualified for the main tournament.

Group G
As Indonesia, the 2022 FIBA Asia Cup host, finished third in Group A, they did not participate. Instead, Guam and Chinese Taipei played twice against each other in Mangilao, Guam. On 10 August 2021, tip-off times have been confirmed.

All times are local.

Group H
Matches took place from 20 to 22 August 2021, in Jeddah, Saudi Arabia. On 10 August 2021, tip-off times were confirmed.

All times are local.

Qualified teams

Statistical leaders
As of 28 August 2021.

Players
Points

Rebounds

Assists

Blocks

Steals

Minutes

Free throws

Field goal shooting

Double-doubles

Other statistical leaders

Notes

References

qualification
FIBA
FIBA Asia